Mirza Ismail Beg Hamdani (died March 1794) was a Mughal Commander. Son of Mirza Munim Beg and a kinsman of Mirza Najaf Khan, he along with his family fled Persia at the rise of Nadir Shah.

Biography 
Arriving in India many members of his family including him rose to high positions in the Mughal Empire. Initially a stalwart of the Maratha's he would defect in 1790, in order to check the rising power of Mahadji Scinde. He would be defeated by the Maratha's at the Battle of Patan whereafter he would flee to Jaipur and thereafter to Jodhpur. He would go to Kanaud, later known as Mahendragarh and attempt to marry the widow of Najaf Quli Khan. Despite her initial approval the latter would renege. Ismail Beg fled to Madhogarh and when the Maratha's received this intel, Khande Rao would march against Madhogarh where Ismail Beg would be captured in 1792 and imprisoned thereafter in Agra Fort, only to be put to death in March 1794.

References 

Year of birth unknown
1794 deaths
Mughal Empire people
Mughal nobility
Indian military leaders
18th-century Indian people